Jagmal Singh (born 20 March 1923) is an Indian long-distance runner. He competed in the marathon at the 1960 Summer Olympics.

References

External links
 

1923 births
Possibly living people
Athletes (track and field) at the 1960 Summer Olympics
Indian male long-distance runners
Indian male marathon runners
Olympic athletes of India
Athletes from Haryana